Martingale may refer to:

Martingale (probability theory), a stochastic process in which the conditional expectation of the next value, given the current and preceding values, is the current value
Martingale (tack) for horses
Martingale (collar) for dogs and other animals
Martingale (betting system), in 18th century France
a dolphin striker, a spar aboard a sailing ship
In the sport of fencing, a martingale is a strap attached to the sword handle to prevent a sword from being dropped if disarmed
In the theatrical lighting industry, martingale is an obsolete term for a twofer, or occasionally a threefer